Phrenic arteries may refer to

 Inferior phrenic arteries
 Superior phrenic arteries